Tiny Thief was a point and click adventure video game which was developed by 5Ants and published by Rovio Entertainment. The game was part of Rovio Entertainment's Rovio Stars program. The story of Tiny Thief follows a childlike thief whose goal is to steal items from enemies.

Gameplay 
In Tiny Thief, players control a child-looking thief who is attempting to steal items placed in an area of the level from multiple enemies. Players control the thief by tapping or clicking on an accessible area, such as a ladder, a door or other paths where the thief can navigate to. The thief can also pick up certain objects which helps completing each level.

The game consists of six quests, each with a different plot, set in a vague medieval period. Along the way, players will encounter enemies such as pirates, bakers, sheriffs, as well as the dark knight. On each quest, there are five levels.

The game uses a three-star rating system; therefore, players can receive one, two or three stars depending on goal completions. The central star is given when the thief successfully steals the main object, which is required to complete the level. The left star is given when the thief steals multiple hidden objects in a level. The right star is given when the player taps (or clicks) the thief's hidden pet ferret. The game also include achievements that can be obtained by completing certain tasks.

Development 
In May 2013, Rovio announced their plans on making a project called Rovio Stars, where they would publish games made by third-party developers as an effort to boost their game lineup.

Two months later, Rovio Stars released Tiny Thief, a game developed by Barcelona-based studio 5Ants on iOS and Android. It was their second game released from the project; with the first one being Icebreaker: A Viking Voyage.

In November 2015, Abylight Studios alongside 5Ants developed the game on efforts for it to be released on the Wii U. On a blog posted by Abylight, they stated that "Art, graphics and gameplay over 30 different levels, 50 unique characters, 3000 unique animations and over 100 hidden objects, have drawn the attention of Nintendo Japan for making a Wii U title". The game was later available on the Japanese Wii U Nintendo eShop for a price of 800 yen.

Rovio discontinued development of Tiny Thief and removed it from app stores in February 2016.

Reception 

Tiny Thief received favorable reviews on the aggregate review website Metacritic; the game attained an overall score of 86 out of 100 based on 21 reviews. It has been presented with the "Editor’s Choice" on the iOS App Store and won the People's Choice Award at the 10th annual International Mobile Gaming Awards.

References

External links 
 (Archived via Wayback Machine on 14 September 2013)

2013 video games
Android (operating system) games
IOS games
MacOS games
Puzzle video games
Video games developed in Spain
Wii U eShop games
Windows games
Rovio Entertainment games